Fort McDowell is an unincorporated community in Maricopa County, Arizona, United States. Fort McDowell is 23 miles northeast of Phoenix. Fort McDowell has a post office with ZIP code 85264.

History
The location was named Camp McDowell, and later renamed Fort McDowell in 1867 when established by the California Volunteers on the Verde River in 1865. It was named for Major General Irvin McDowell. The fort was located within Indian country and built to be near the area's travel routes in an effort to protect them from the Apache who lived in the Gila River and Salt River valleys. The post office opened as McDowell in 1869 and changed to Fort McDowell in 1923. Some Native Americans of the region chose to seek refuge in the surrounding mountains rather than conform to the constraints of reservation life. These displaced Indians often traveled in small groups to avoid detection. Their presence, however, caused fear and unrest for nervous settlers, and thus a military outpost (Camp Verde) was deemed necessary to protect trade routes within the region. In addition to the Salt and Verde rivers, Fort McDowell was in close proximity to a number of trails important to the Apache of central Arizona, and the installation conducted numerous military exercises against the Tonto Apache and others. Originally named Camp Verde, the fort was thought to be able to withstand an onslaught from these so-called 'renegades', but in fact, the structures failed to survive the heavy summer monsoon rains, washing away not long after being built. The Stoneman Military Trail served as a supply trail and connected Fort McDowell to Fort Whipple in Prescott, Arizona, during the years 1870–1890.

Climate
According to the Köppen Climate Classification system, Fort McDowell has a semi-arid climate, abbreviated "BSk" on climate maps.

Historic Fort McDowell

References

External links
 Fort McDowell Yavapai Nation – official site

Unincorporated communities in Maricopa County, Arizona
McDowell